Thiadric Hansen (born December 26, 1992) is a German professional Canadian football linebacker for the Winnipeg Blue Bombers of the Canadian Football League (CFL).

Professional career
Hansen first played for the Flensburg Sealords in the Oberliga before joining the Kiel Baltic Hurricanes in 2012. He played for the Hurricanes for seven years and was the club's all-time leading tackler. He then joined the Potsdam Royals in 2019 before getting the invitation to try out for the CFL just before the start of the 2019 GFL season.

Following a successful showcase, Hansen was drafted second overall in the 2019 European CFL Draft by the Winnipeg Blue Bombers and was added to the roster on May 15, 2019. Overall in 2019, he played in all 18 regular season games and recorded five defensive tackles, a sack, and two forced fumbles. He also played in all three of the Blue Bombers playoff games where he had two special teams tackles. Hansen played in his first Grey Cup game and had a thunderous hit on special teams taking out both a blocker and the returner, a hit for which he received national acclaim. Hansen and the Bombers would go on to win the 107th Grey Cup against the Hamilton Tiger-Cats which ended a championship drought of 28 years for Winnipeg.

With the 2020 CFL season cancelled, Hansen opted out of his contract and joined the Panthers Wrocław, a Polish team in the Central European Football League as a way to maintain and sharpen his skills. The Panthers won the Polish Bowl in 2020 against the Lowlanders Białystok. He signed a one-year contract extension with the Blue Bombers on January 6, 2021.

Hansen signed with the new European League of Football's Cologne Centurions (ELF) under a contract that contained a clause allowing him to return to the CFL in time for training camp. However, he did not play for the team as he returned to the Blue Bombers.

In 2021, Hansen played in all 14 regular season games where he had eight defensive tackles, 12 special teams tackles, three sacks, and one forced fumble. He then had two special teams tackles in the team's West Final victory over the Saskatchewan Roughriders. He played in his second career Grey Cup game and while he did not record any stats, he won his second championship following the Blue Bombers win in the 108th Grey Cup game. He became a free agent upon the expiry of his contract on February 8, 2022. Hansen was reluctant to sign another contract since he would be still be making the minimum salary for a Global player ($54,000) due to the league's collective bargaining agreement, despite being a productive veteran on the team. However, on June 18, 2022, it was announced that Hansen had re-signed with the Blue Bombers.

References

External links
Winnipeg Blue Bombers bio

1992 births
Living people
Canadian football linebackers
People from Flensburg
German Football League players
Winnipeg Blue Bombers players
German players of American football
German players of Canadian football
German expatriate sportspeople in Canada
Competitors at the 2017 World Games
World Games silver medalists
German expatriate sportspeople in Poland
Expatriate players of American football
Cologne Centurions (ELF) players
Sportspeople from Schleswig-Holstein